= Sarah D. Greer =

Irish novelist (1805–1891)

- Born: Sarah Dinah Strangman; 23 January 1805; Waterford
- Died: 2 May 1891 (aged 86); Torquay
- Occupation: Novelist
- Spouse(s): John Robert Greer
- Parent(s): John Hancock Strangman; Dinah Wilson Newsom

Sarah Dinah Greer (née Strangman; 23 January 1805 – 2 May 1891) was an Irish novelist who published under the names Mrs. J. R. Greer and Mrs. S. Greer. Raised a Quaker, she is known for writing critical of Quakerism following her expulsion from the Society of Friends.

== Biography ==
Sarah Dinah Strangman was born 23 January 1805 in Waterford, Ireland, the daughter of John Hancock Strangman, a wealthy Quaker merchant, and Dinah Wilson Newsom Strangman. She was educated at the Suir Island Quaker School. In 1829, she married John Robert Greer, a Quaker.

Greer was expelled from the Quakers at some point in her life and appears to have embraced the Church of Ireland. In the early 1850s, she published two anti-Quaker works, an anonymous autobiography called Quakerism; or the Story of My Life (1851) and a fictionalized expose called The Society of Friends: A Domestic Narrative (1852). These works prompted a number of response pamphlets from outraged Quakers, including Ostentation: or, Critical Remarks on 'Quakerism; or, the Story of My Life' (1852) by Sandham Elly. Though her portrayal of Quakerism is unflattering and noted for its attack on a number of individual Quakers, her work is considered a resource for scholars regarding the inner workings of 19th century Irish Quakerism.

Greer died in Torquay on May 2, 1891.

== Bibliography ==
- Quakerism; or the Story of My Life by a lady, who for forty years was a member of the Society of Friends. Dublin: Samuel B. Oldham, 1851.
- The Society of Friends: A Domestic Narrative, Illustrating the Peculiar Doctrines Held By the Disciples of George Fox by Mrs. J. R. Greer. London: Saunders & Otley, 1852.
- The Chained Bible, and Other Poems by Mrs. S Greer. Dublin: Herbert, 1851.
